The Potato Movement is a grassroots socio-agriculture movement in Greece. The movement consists of Greek farmers setting up co-ops and selling potatoes directly to the Greek public in response to cheap potato imports from Egypt and other countries.

References

Agriculture in Greece
Cooperatives in Greece
Food retailers of Greece
Greek government-debt crisis
History of the potato